Marcus Glenn Cotton (born August 11, 1966) is a former American football linebacker.

High school career
Cotton prepped at Castlemont High School in Oakland.

College career
He played college football and was All-Pac-10 at the University of Southern California.

Professional career
Cotton played in the National Football League between 1988 and 1992.

1966 births
Living people
Players of American football from Los Angeles
American football linebackers
USC Trojans football players
Atlanta Falcons players
Cleveland Browns players
Seattle Seahawks players